Ian Pedigo (born in 1973 in Anchorage, Alaska), is a sculptor, image and installation-based artist and writer living and working in New York, NY (Queens).  His artwork involves merging natural materials with the synthetic, as well as the experience of material and image-based aesthetics as acts of discovery, creation, and recovery.  His works can be perceived as premeditated artifacts of an archaeological nature, found within the context of the near-present while appearing as discrete aesthetic objects in their own right.  He classifies his work as dealing with a "modal environs", referring to an art produced within an aesthetics-based ecology similar to the Vibrant Matter and Ecology of Matter of Jane Bennett (political theorist). He received his Master of Arts from the University of Texas at Austin with concentrations in installation, sculpture, and communications. He also participated in the 2001 Salzburg International Summer Academy of Fine Art, studying with Ilya Kabakov & Emilia Kabakov and the theorist/critic Boris Groys.

His first solo show in New York took place at Klaus von Nichtssagend Gallery in 2006, earning critical attention  for his unorthodox formal recombinations of found materials. He has subsequently exhibited internationally with solo and group exhibitions at galleries and institutions in New York City, Chicago, Washington D.C., Brussels, London, Paris, Florence, Milan, Gothenburg (Sweden), Southern Alberta (Lethbridge, Canada), and Chattanooga (TN), among other locations.

Pedigo has lectured widely on his work at universities and institutions in the US and Europe including the Chicago Art Institute, University of Lethbridge, University of Tennessee at Chattanooga, University of Gothenburg, Hunter College, American University, Kent State University, Kansas City Art Institute, and the Modern Art Museum of Fort Worth. He is the recipient of a Pollock-Krasner Foundation award, an Artists' Fellowship Inc. grant, a Foundation for Contemporary Arts grant, and a Socrates Sculpture Park award. His work is held in several private collections as well as the Whitney Museum of American Art.

Pedigo's work has garnered critical praise in many art publications such as New York Times, the New Yorker, Artforum, Art in America, Hyperallergic, and ARTnews. In 2011 the Southern Alberta Art Gallery published a monograph on Pedigo's work featured writing by critic and curator Chris Sharp and an interview with the writer and critic Lillian Davies.

He is represented by Klaus von Nichtssagend Gallery in New York and shows with 65Grand in Chicago.

Publications

References

External links 
  on the Klaus von Nichtssagend website
  Ian Pedigo home page

1973 births
Living people